Corriere del Trentino is an Italian local newspaper owned by RCS MediaGroup and based in Trento, Italy. It was launched in 2003 in Trentino, on the basis of Corriere del Mezzogiorno.

References

External links
 Corriere del Trentino Corporate Website 

2003 establishments in Italy
Italian-language newspapers
Mass media in Trento
Publications established in 2003
RCS MediaGroup newspapers
Daily newspapers published in Italy